Mount Gorton is a prominent mountain,  high, located  west-southwest of Mount Perez in the southern Wilson Hills of Antarctica. It was photographed by U.S. Navy Operation Highjump, 1946–47. The mountain was sighted in 1961 by Phillip Law of the Australian National Antarctic Research Expeditions and was positioned by observations from the ship Magga Dan. It was named by the Antarctic Names Committee of Australia after Senator J.G. Gorton, Australian Minister for the Navy at that time.

References

Mountains of Oates Land